Benoît Biteau (born 7 April 1967 in Royan) is a French politician who was elected as a Member of the European Parliament in 2019.

References

MEPs for France 2019–2024
1967 births
Living people